Witherby Publishing Group, formerly known as Witherby Seamanship, is a technical publisher of maritime, nautical and navigation training, reference and regulatory materials. The company is the resulting merger of Witherby Books and Seamanship International in January 2008. Beginning with its origins in 1740 it lays claim to being the oldest independent publisher in the English-speaking world. 
 	
Witherbys are the official electronic distributors for the International Maritime Organization and publish guidance titles with numerous shipping bodies and maritime NGOs. These include the International Chamber of Shipping, the UK Chamber of Shipping, BIMCO, OCIMF, SIGTTO, North P&I, the UK P&I Club, the International Association of Classification Societies, the Merchant Navy Training Board and the Institute of Marine Engineering, Science and Technology (IMarEST). Witherbys are an official distributor of INTERTANKO publications. 

The company holds working groups, which include specialist consultants from relevant sectors, as well as in-house technical advisors, authors and editors, to produce their publications.

History
The company's tradition of publishing and bookselling was initially started by the stationer Thomas Witherby at the company's founding in 1740 in the City of London. The early company developed as a copier and producer of legal documents, including articles of agreements, bonds and pro-forma contracts for marine insurance and carriage of goods by sea, operating in proximity to the maritime trade of the adjacent Coffeehouses. From 1749 until 1873, the company was located at Birchin Lane, adjacent to Lombard Street in London before later moving to several premises, including a building in Clerkenwell and later in Aylesbury Street, Islington. Throughout this period, the operating name of the changed from Witherby and Son to Witherby and Company, including a subsidiary HF and G Witherby that specialised in ornithology books under the auspices of Harry Forbes Witherby, a descendant of Thomas Witherby. The collections of the early Witherby company are available at the London Metropolitan Archives. 

In 1998, the company Seamanship International was begun by Iain Macneil providing training materials for the maritime industry from Scotland and in 2008 the company bought out and merged with Witherbys, moving the business to Scotland (the physical printing arm of the company was sold off under the name WKG Print). Since relocating to Scotland, the company has expanded to become one of the largest maritime publishers in the world, publishing over 400 titles to over 110 countries in the world. It is estimated that there are more than a million Witherby ebooks in use on over 40,000 ships.

In December 2020, David Balston, a former Royal Navy Vanguard-class submarine Commander, Prime Ministerial advisor and head of Policy at the UK Chamber of Shipping joined Witherbys as Deputy Chairman and non-executive director.

Location

The company has registered offices in Edinburgh, Scotland, with the main offices and warehouse being located at Navigation House in Livingston, Scotland.

Products
Witherbys publishes on a range of maritime technical and operational subjects including navigation, Ballast Water Management, ECDIS, Oil tanker operations, LNG tanker operations, seamanship, ship stability and passage planning. 

Together with the UK P&I Club, Witherbys publishes the marine reference book Carefully to Carry, which contains guidance on the safe carriage, loading and storage of cargo on cargo ships. In September 2021, with the UK P&I Club and CAE, Witherby published a safety publication entitled Maritime Team Dynamics, a safety book comparing aviation and maritime incidents.

In February 2019, in conjunction with BIMCO and International Shipcare, Witherbys released the Ship Lay-up Guide.

In response to IMO efforts to require cyber security to be addressed under the International Safety Management Code, in November 2019, together with BIMCO and the International Chamber of Shipping Witherbys published the Cyber Security Workbook for Onboard Ship Use. A second edition was published in October 2020.

On behalf of OCIMF and the International Chamber of Shipping, the company publishes the International Safety Guide for Oil Tankers and Terminals (ISGOTT), which is used as a reference guide on most oil tankers and in most terminals. A sixth edition of ISGOTT was published in June 2020. With OCIMF, Witherbys also publish the Mooring Equipment Guidelines, the 4th edition was published in 2018.

In partnership with the International Chamber of Shipping, Witherbys publishes Drug Trafficking and Drug Abuse On Board Ship: Guidelines for Owners and Masters on Preparation, Prevention, Protection and Response. In 2021, the sixth edition of the publication was released, offering guidance on how to protect the ship and crew via a range of security measures, while reducing the risk of drug trafficking occurring on board. Witherbys also publish the ICS guidance on Maritime security with a publication entitled Maritime Security - A comprehensive Guide for Shipowners, Seafarers and Administrations.

With Maritime Industry Australia, Witherbys publish a Passage Planning Guide for the Great Barrier Reef and Torres Strait.

Together with BIMCO, the company publishes an annual guidance title on contractual risks entitled Check Before Fixing.

In 2021, the company issued Witherby Connect, an eBook reader software for the marine industry. Also in 2021, the company launched an LNG carrier mooring tool called SHIPMOOR in partnership with the research company HR Wallingford. 

In June 2022, with BIMCO and the Danish Pilotage Organisation DanPilot, the company published a Passage Planning Guide on the Baltic Sea covering the region from Skagen to Bornholm. In August 2022, in partnership with ICS and BIMCO, Witherbys published a guidance title for the shipping industry on biofouling entitled Biofouling, Biosecurity and Hull Cleaning.

Awards	
Awards for the publisher have included the Queens Award for Enterprise, a Lloyds List Training Award and a Green Award. In March 2017, the company won the Sea Transport Award for 'best marine training material publishing company'.

Charitable Trust and Scholarships
In 2020, the company funded two publishing scholarships with Edinburgh Napier University and the University of Stirling. In 2021, the company offered a scholarship for an MLitt in Publishing Studies at the Stirling University Centre for International Publishing and Communication.

The company manages a charitable trust which provides funds for sport, arts and education in Scotland. In 2010, the trust paid for sports equipment for children in Malawi. In 2019, the trust lead fundraising efforts to provide a gift of a new Steinway piano to St Mary's Music School in the West End of Edinburgh. For Christmas 2020, the trust funded the Witherby Arts Festival to support emerging musicians in Scotland. In June 2021, the trust supported the summer camp of the Royal Scottish National Orchestra (RSNO). In September 2021, the trust donated £4,000 to the community Cairngorm Biathlon & Nordic Ski Club. In December 2021, the trust celebrated reaching £1,000,000 of charitable giving since 2011.

In March 2023, the trust donated £105,000 to provide scholarships and bursaries for students from rural backgrounds to attend the University of the Highlands and Islands.

MV Astra
In 2020, Witherbys purchased MV Astra, a 24 metre Finnish-Swedish ice class rescue ship (formerly operated as the lead vessel of the Swedish Sea Rescue Society). The ship undertook conversion work in 2021 and is provides research opportunities for Witherbys, including the undertaking of an expedition to complete a 22,000 nautical mile circumnavigation in 2021/2022 via the Cape of Good Hope and Cape Horn. The voyage began in December 2021 departing from Lanzarote. The ship then sailed to the Pacific Ocean via Cape Horn. By mid-February 2022, the ship had reached its halfway point of a 25,000 mile circumnavigation. On 16 May 2022, the ship completed its circumnavigation becoming the first sub-24m motor-powered vessel to circumnavigate the globe via the southern capes, setting a new world record for this class and voyage.

References

External links
Witherby Publishing Group
Witherby Seamanship

Book publishing companies of Scotland
Publishing companies of the United Kingdom
Companies based in Edinburgh
Companies
British Merchant Navy